Bendigo Spirit is one of three Victorian basketball teams in the Australian Women's National Basketball League. The team, based in the regional city of Bendigo, Victoria, joined the competition from the 2007/08 season.

History
The Bendigo Spirit were formed in 2007 and started playing out of Bendigo Stadium, the first side based in regional Victoria. Coached by Bernie Harrower, the team was led by his daughter, Australian Opal and captain, Kristi Harrower. The Spirit have won the WNBL Championship twice (2013 & 2014) led by the likes of Harrower, Gabrielle Richards, Kelly Wilson as well as imports Chelsea Aubry and the now naturalised, Kelsey Griffin.

Season-by-season records

Source: Bendigo Spirit

Players

Current roster

Former players
 Kathleen MacLeod, (2007–08)
 Jenna O'Hea, (2007–08)
 Kristi Harrower, (2008–2015)
 Chelsea Aubry, (2009–2015)
 Heather Oliver, (2010–2018)
/ Kelsey Griffin, (2012–2018)
 Sara Blicavs, (2013–2015)
 Belinda Snell, (2014–2016)
 Betnijah Laney, (2017–18)
 Jennie Rintala
 Carley Ernst
 Chevannah Paalvast
 Alicia Froling
 Amelia Todhunter

Coaches and staff

Head coaches

| Kennedy Kereama || 2022 || Current || 1 || 7|| 0 || 100|| 0 || 0 || 0 || 0.0 || 0

Ownership
In April 2022, the team's WNBL license was purchased from Bendigo Stadium Limited (BSL) by Sports Entertainment Network (SEN).

References

External links
 Official WNBL Team Site
 Bendigo Spirit official website

 
Women's National Basketball League teams
Basketball teams in Victoria (Australia)
Basketball teams established in 2007
Articles containing video clips